Beta-alanopine dehydrogenase is an enzyme that catalyzes the chemical reaction

beta-alanopine + NAD+ + H2O  beta-alanine + pyruvate + NADH + H+

The 3 substrates of this enzyme are beta-alanopine, nicotinamide adenine dinucleotide ion, and water, whereas its 4 products are beta-alanine, pyruvate, nicotinamide adenine dinucleotide, and hydrogen ion.

This enzyme belongs to the family of oxidoreductases, specifically those acting on the CH-NH group of donors with NAD+ or NADP+ as acceptor.  The systematic name of this enzyme class is N-(D-1-carboxyethyl)-beta-alanine:NAD+ oxidoreductase (beta-alanine-forming).

References

 

EC 1.5.1
NADH-dependent enzymes
Enzymes of unknown structure